MPRI may refer to:
 Military Professional Resources Inc., a private military contractor.
 Midwest Proton Radiotherapy Institute, a proton therapy treatment center in Bloomington, Indiana.
 Master Parisien de Recherche en Informatique, a French master course in theoretical computer science